Bammy is a traditional Jamaican cassava flatbread descended from the simple flatbread eaten by the Arawaks, Jamaica's original inhabitants. Today, it is produced in many rural communities and sold in stores and by street vendors in Jamaica and abroad.

Bammies have been consumed since pre-Columbian times and is believed to have originated with the native Arawak people. For centuries, it was the bread staple for rural Jamaicans until the cheaper, imported wheat flour breads became popular in the post-World War II era.

In the 1990s, the United Nations and the Jamaican government established a program to revive bammy production and to market it as a modern, convenient food product.

Bammy is made from bitter cassava (also called yuca and manioc in other American cultures). Traditionally, the cassava is grated and placed in a press bag (woven with thatch leaves) and placed in an outdoor press where heavy stones are loaded on. Once completely drained, but still a bit moist, the cassava is beaten in a mortar then sieved to a fine flour texture. Salt is then added to taste.

The actual baking of bammies varies across Jamaican communities. Traditionally, it is made by spreading a handful of the flour evenly in a baking ring on a flat iron or griddle on the open fire. While baking, the top of the bammy is patted with a flat board and then turned over. The baking process takes about 3 minutes and the final product is a thin, foldable bread about 10" in diameter. This is similar to traditional tortillas of Native American cultures. It can then be eaten with whatever fillings are desired.

The more modern (and popular) approach is to bake thicker bammies about 6" in diameter. These are often mass-produced in factories. When home-baked, the flour may be store-bought or made by hand-pressing. The bammy can be baked on griddles or in baking pans on a stove top. Some choose to bake it inside an oven, and to add butter and other spices before baking. Baking takes longer due to the thickness, and the final product is then cut into halves or wedges for freezing. When ready to eat, the wedges are soaked in coconut milk and then fried to a golden brown, and served with meat, fish, avocado, or other side dishes.

Bammies, like wheat bread and tortillas, are served at any meal or consumed as a snack. Cassava that is fried is eaten in many other islands. Dominica call theirs Kalinago.Fried cassava is a common snack food in Brazil, Venezuela, Colombia, Ecuador, and several Central American countries including Panama.

See also
Coco bread
Hard dough bread
Bulla cakes
Jamaican cuisine
 List of Jamaican dishes

References

Jamaican cuisine
Flatbreads
Jamaican breads
Cassava dishes
Indigenous cuisine